Eliza Surdyka (born 16 March 1977) is a Polish cross-country skier. She competed in the women's 15 kilometre classical at the 1998 Winter Olympics.

References

External links
 

1977 births
Living people
People from Świebodzice
Polish female cross-country skiers
Olympic cross-country skiers of Poland
Cross-country skiers at the 1998 Winter Olympics